Biological engineering or 
bioengineering is the application of principles of biology and the tools of engineering to create usable, tangible, economically-viable products.  Biological engineering employs knowledge and expertise from a number of pure and applied sciences, such as mass and heat transfer, kinetics, biocatalysts, biomechanics, bioinformatics, separation and purification processes, bioreactor design, surface science, fluid mechanics, thermodynamics, and polymer science. It is used in the design of medical devices, diagnostic equipment, biocompatible materials, renewable energy, ecological engineering, agricultural engineering, process engineering and catalysis, and other areas that improve the living standards of societies.

Examples of bioengineering research include bacteria engineered to produce chemicals, new medical imaging technology, portable and rapid disease diagnostic devices, prosthetics, biopharmaceuticals, and tissue-engineered organs.  Bioengineering overlaps substantially with biotechnology and the biomedical sciences in a way analogous to how various other forms of engineering and technology relate to various other sciences (such as aerospace engineering and other space technology to kinetics and astrophysics).

In general, biological engineers attempt to either mimic biological systems to create products, or to modify and control biological systems.  Working with doctors, clinicians, and researchers, bioengineers use traditional engineering principles and techniques to address biological processes, including ways to replace, augment, sustain, or predict chemical and mechanical processes.

History
Biological engineering is a science-based discipline founded upon the biological sciences in the same way that chemical engineering, electrical engineering, and mechanical engineering can be based upon chemistry, electricity and magnetism, and classical mechanics, respectively.

Before WWII, biological engineering had begun being recognized as a branch of engineering and was a new concept to people. Post-WWII, it grew more rapidly, and the term "bioengineering" was coined by British scientist and broadcaster Heinz Wolff in 1954 at the National Institute for Medical Research. Wolff graduated that year and became the director of the Division of Biological Engineering at the university. This was the first time Bioengineering was recognized as its own branch at a university. Electrical engineering was the early focus of this discipline, due to work with medical devices and machinery during this time.

When engineers and life scientists started working together, they recognized that the engineers didn't know enough about the actual biology behind their work. To resolve this problem, engineers who wanted to get into biological engineering devoted more time to studying the processes of biology, psychology, and medicine.

More recently, the term biological engineering has been applied to environmental modifications such as surface soil protection, slope stabilization, watercourse and shoreline protection, windbreaks, vegetation barriers including noise barriers and visual screens, and the ecological enhancement of an area. Because other engineering disciplines also address living organisms, the term biological engineering can be applied more broadly to include agricultural engineering.

The first biological engineering program in the United States was started at University of California, San Diego in 1966.  More recent programs have been launched at MIT and Utah State University. Many old agricultural engineering departments in universities over the world have re-branded themselves as agricultural and biological engineering or agricultural and biosystems engineering. According to Professor Doug Lauffenburger of MIT, biological engineering has a broad base which applies engineering principles to an enormous range of size and complexities of systems, ranging from the molecular level (molecular biology, biochemistry, microbiology, pharmacology, protein chemistry, cytology, immunology, neurobiology and, neuroscience) to cellular and tissue-based systems (including devices and sensors), to whole macroscopic organisms (plants, animals), and even to biomes and ecosystems.

Education 
The average length of study is three to five years, and the completed degree is signified as a bachelor of engineering (B.S. in engineering). Fundamental courses include thermodynamics, biomechanics, biology, genetic engineering, fluid and mechanical dynamics, chemical and enzyme kinetics, electronics, and materials properties.

Sub-disciplines

Depending on the institution and particular definitional boundaries employed, some major branches of bioengineering may be categorized as (note these may overlap):

 Biomedical engineering: application of engineering principles and design concepts to medicine and biology for healthcare purposes. 
 Tissue engineering 
 Genetic engineering 
 Neural engineering 
 Pharmaceutical engineering 
 Clinical engineering 
 Bioinformatics 
 Biomechanics
 Biochemical engineering: fermentation engineering, application of engineering principles to microscopic biological systems that are used to create new products by synthesis, including the production of protein from suitable raw materials.
 Biological systems engineering: application of engineering principles and design concepts to agriculture, food sciences, and ecosystems.
 Bioprocess engineering: develops technology to monitor the conditions of where a particular process takes place, (Ex: bioprocess design, biocatalysis, bioseparation, bioinformatics, bioenergy) 
 Environmental health engineering: application of engineering principles to the control of the environment for the health, comfort, and safety of human beings. It includes the field of life-support systems for the exploration of outer space and the ocean. 
 Human factors and ergonomics engineering: application of engineering, physiology, and psychology to the optimization of the human–machine relationship. (Ex: physical ergonomics, cognitive ergonomics, human–computer interaction) 
 Biotechnology: the use of living systems and organisms to develop or make products. (Ex: pharmaceuticals).
 Biomimetics: the imitation of models, systems, and elements of nature for the purpose of solving complex human problems. (Ex: velcro, designed after George de Mestral noticed how easily burs stuck to a dog's hair).
 Bioelectrical engineering 
 Biomechanical engineering : is the application of mechanical engineering principals and biology to determine how these areas relate and how they can be integrated to potentially improve human health. 
 Bionics: an integration of Biomedical, focused more on the robotics and assisted technologies. (Ex: prosthetics)
 Bioprinting: utilizing biomaterials to print organs and new tissues
 Biorobotics: (Ex: electrical prosthetics)
 Systems biology: Molecules, cells, organs, and organisms are all investigated in terms of their interactions and behaviors.

Organizations 
 Accreditation Board for Engineering and Technology (ABET), the U.S.-based accreditation board for engineering B.S. programs, makes a distinction between biomedical engineering and biological engineering, though there is much overlap (see above).
 American Institute for Medical and Biological Engineering (AIMBE) is made up of 1,500 members. Their main goal is to educate the public about the value biological engineering has in our world, as well as invest in research and other programs to advance the field. They give out awards to those dedicated to innovation in the field, and awards of achievement in the field. (They do not have a direct contribution to biological engineering, they more recognize those who do and encourage the public to continue that forward movement).
 Institute of Biological Engineering (IBE) is a non-profit organization, they run on donations alone. They aim to encourage the public to learn and to continue advancements in biological engineering. (Like AIMBE, they do not perform research directly; however, they offer scholarships to students who show promise in the field).
 Society for Biological Engineering (SBE) is a technological community associated with the American Institute of Chemical Engineers (AIChE). SBE hosts international conferences, and is a global organization of leading engineers and scientists dedicated to advancing the integration of biology with engineering.

References

External links
 Bioengineering Society
 Biomedical Engineering Society
 Institute of Biological Engineering
 Benjoe Institute of Systems Biological Engineering
 American Institute of Medical and Biological Engineering
 American Society of Agricultural and Biological Engineers
 Society for Biological Engineering part of AIChE
 Journal of Biological Engineering, JBE
 Biological Engineering Transactions
Munich School of BioEngineering